The FIRS Men's World Inline Hockey Championship VIII was played between July 25 and August 1, 2002, in the American city of Rochester, New York. The venue was the ESL Sports Centre. The tournament was won by Canada which claimed its first ever gold medal. It was the eighth FIRS World Championship event, and was run by the International Roller Sports Federation (FIRS).

Participating countries

Rules
For standing purposes, points shall be awarded as follows:
 2 points for a win in regulation or overtime
 1 point for a tie in regulation or overtime
 No points for a loss in regulation or overtime

If a game is tied after regulation time in the round robin, the game ends in a tie. In the placement and medal rounds, a twelve-minute four-on-four sudden-death overtime session is played.

If teams are tied in a standing based on points, the following tie-breakers are applied:
1) The most points earned in direct games involving tied teams.
2) The best goal differential in direct games involving tied teams.
3) The most goal scored in direct games involving tied teams.
4) Follow steps 1, 2 and 3 with games involving the highest non-tied team in the same group.
5) Repeat step 4 with games involving the second highest non-tied team in the same group.
6) Continue this process with all non-tied team games.

Preliminary round
After playing a round robin, the top four teams moved on to the Medal Rounds while the last five teams competed in the Placement Rounds.

Ranking and statistics

Tournament Awards

Final standings
The final standings of the tournament according to FIRS:

See also 
 FIRS Inline Hockey World Championships
 List of FIRS Senior Men's Inline Hockey World Championships medalists

2002 in American sports
Inline hockey tournaments
International sports competitions hosted by the United States
Inline hockey in the United States